Narayanappavalasa is a village and panchayat in Bobbili mandal, Vizianagaram district of Andhra Pradesh, India. There is a railway station at Narayanappavalasa on the Bobbili-Salur branch railway line.

References

Villages in Vizianagaram district